The Journal of Scottish Historical Studies is a bi-annual peer-reviewed academic journal published by Edinburgh University Press on behalf of the Economic and Social History Society of Scotland in May and November of each year. It was established in 1980 as Scottish Economic and Social History and took its current title in 2004. It covers research on the history of Scotland.

External links 
 
 Economic and Social History Society of Scotland

Edinburgh University Press academic journals
Publications established in 1980
Biannual journals
British history journals
English-language journals
Historiography of Scotland
1980 establishments in Scotland
Scottish studies